Çaxırlı or Caxırlı or Chakhirly or Chakhyrly may refer to:
Çaxırlı, Goychay, Azerbaijan
Çaxırlı, Imishli, Azerbaijan
Çaxırlı, Jabrayil, Azerbaijan
Çaxırlı, Masally, Azerbaijan